Dinoseris is a monotypic genus of flowering plants in the family Asteraceae, containing the single species Dinoseris salicifolia. It is native to Bolivia and Argentina. It was formerly included in genus Hyaloseris.

References

Monotypic Asteraceae genera
Flora of Argentina
Flora of Bolivia
Stifftioideae